Emma Berginger (born 1986) is a Swedish politician.  she serves as Member of the Riksdag representing the constituency of Skåne Southern. She was also elected as Member of the Riksdag in September 2022. She took a leave of absence from 20 September 2021 till 19 May 2022.

She serves as transport policy spokesperson for the Green Party.

References 

Living people
1986 births
Place of birth missing (living people)
21st-century Swedish politicians
21st-century Swedish women politicians
Members of the Riksdag 2018–2022
Members of the Riksdag 2022–2026
Members of the Riksdag from the Green Party
Women members of the Riksdag